First ever Gujjar Muslim from Jammu and Kashmir nominated to Rajya sabha.
Choudhary Mohammad Aslam Lassanvi (02 October 1939 - ). Born in village Lassana in Surankote Poonch) was a politician from the Indian National Congress party, a Member of the Parliament of India represented Jammu and Kashmir in the Rajya Sabha, the upper house of the Parliament, with term ending on 29 November 2008.

Early life and education
Born in 1944, Ch Aslam belonged to village Lassana in Surankote. He did his matriculation from Government High School, Poonch before going to Aligarh Muslim University to study further.
The deceased congressman was the son of a prominent Gujjar leader, Chowdhary Ghulam Hussain Lassanvi. His father had formed Gujjar Jat Conference for the welfare of Gujjar community and common people. After partition of India and Pakistan in 1947, family of Ch Aslam crossed over to Pakistan administered Kashmir (PaK) but returned to Poonch in 1951.

Career
Following the footsteps of his father after returning from Aligarh, he joined politics. He fought elections in 1966 from Surankote defeating Syed Jamat Ali Shah, who had won elections unopposed for 13 years from the seat. Ch Aslam joined Congress in 1966 and contested eight elections from Surankote. He was also member of Rajya Sabha. He remained Speaker in the State Assembly for eight years. During his political career of over 48 years, Ch Aslam held important posts including Finance Minister of State, Education Minister, Speaker of Legislative Assembly, Member Parliament in Rajya Sabha, and vice chairman of Gujjar Bakkerwal Advisory Board. He remained J&K Pradesh Congress Committee chief for 17 years.

Death and legacy
Various political parties and social organizations condoled his demise by expressing solidarity with the bereaved family. Offering his condolence to the bereaved family, NC Party President Dr Farooq Abdullah has said that late Aslam's work and contributions towards his community would be remembered with appreciation for a long time to come.
NC Working President and J&K chief minister Omar Abdullah also condoled the demise of Ch Aslam by saying that late Aslam was one of the most accomplished Congress leaders in the state and had dedicated his life to the service of the nomadic Gujjar community.

See also
 Politics of India

References

External links
 Profile on Rajya Sabha website

Indian National Congress politicians
Rajya Sabha members from Jammu and Kashmir
1944 births
2014 deaths
Jammu and Kashmir MLAs 1977–1983
Jammu and Kashmir MLAs 1983–1986
Jammu and Kashmir MLAs 1987–1996
Jammu and Kashmir MLAs 2008–2014